The Gusii language (also known as Ekegusii) is a Bantu language spoken in Kisii and Nyamira counties in Nyanza Kenya, whose headquarters is Kisii Town, (between the Kavirondo Gulf of Lake Victoria and the border with Tanzania). It is spoken natively by 2.2 million people (as of 2009), mostly among the Abagusii. Ekegusii  has only two dialects: The Rogoro and Maate dialects. Phonologically they differ in the articulation of /t/. Most of the variations existing between the two dialects are lexical. The two dialects can refer to the same object or thing using different terms. Example Cat. While one dialect calls a cat ekemoni, the other calls it ekebusi. As well, the rogoro dialect calls sandals Chidiripasi while the maate dialect calls it chitaratara. Many more lexical differences manifest in the language. Maate Dialect is spoken  in Tabaka and Bogirango. Most of the other regions use the Rogoro Dialect, which is also the standard dialect

Sounds

Vowels
Gusii has seven vowels. Vowel length is contrastive, i.e. the words 'bór' to miss and 'bóór' to say are distinguished by vowel length only.

Consonants
In the table below, orthographic symbols are included between brackets if they differ from the IPA symbols. Note especially the use of ‘y’ for IPA , common in African orthographies. When symbols appear in pairs, the one to the right represents a voiced consonant.

The following morphophonological alternations occur:
 n+r = [ⁿd]
 n+b = [ᵐb]
 n+g = [ᵑɡ]
 n+k = [ᵑk]
 n+c = [ⁿtʃ]
 n+s = [ⁿs]
 n+m = [mː]

The Gusii language has the consonant 'b' not realized as the bilabial stop as in 'bat' but as bilabial fricative as in words like baba, baminto, abana.

Ekegusii language Alphabet

Ekegusii Noun Classes

Samples 1

Ekegusii Numeral System

Sample 2

Sample phrases

Bibliography

Bickmore, Lee
1997. Problems in constraining High tone spread in Ekegusii. Lingua, vol. 102, pp. 265–290.
1998. Metathesis and Dahl’s Law in Ekegusii. Studies in the Linguistic Sciences, vol. 28:2, pp. 149–168.
1999. High Tone Spreading in Ekegusii Revisited: An Optimality Theoretic Account. Lingua, vol. 109, pp. 109–153.
Cammenga, Jelle 
 2002 Phonology and morphology of Ekegusii: a Bantu language of Kenya. Köln: Rüdiger Köppe Verlag.
Mreta, Abel Y.
 2008. Kisimbiti: Msamiati wa Kisimbiti-Kiingereza-Kiswahili na Kiingereza-Kisimbiti-Kiswahili / Simbiti-English-Swahili and English-Simbiti-Swahili Lexicon. Languages of Tanzania Project, LOT Publications Lexicon Series 7, 106 pp., .

Nash, Carlos M. 

 2011. Tone in Ekegusii: A Description of Nominal And Verbal Tonology. University of California, Santa Barbara.

Nyauncho, Osinde K. 

 1988. Ekegusii morphophonology: an analysis of the major consonantal processes. University of Nairobi.

Whiteley, Wilfred H. 
 1956 A practical introduction to Gusii. Dar es Salaam/Nairobi/Kampala: East African Literature Bureau. Available Here
 1960 The tense system of Gusii. Kampala: East African Institute of Social Research.
 1974 Language in Kenya. Nairobi: Oxford University Press.

See also
 Languages of Kenya

References

External links
  Gusii.com The Gusii Language Blog
 Ekegusii Encyclopedic Project & online Encyclopedia/Dictionary
American soft power has helped this Kenyan man's efforts to ensure a future for his mother tongue—report by Patrick Cox for Public Radio International (January 26, 207)

Listening
 National Public Radio story about Kisii language (from All Things Considered program, April 29, 2006)

 
Great Lakes Bantu languages
Languages of Kenya